Francisco López (1554 in Colmenar de Oreja near Madrid - 1629) was a Spanish painter and engraver. He was a pupil of Bartolommeo Carducci, whom he assisted in 1595 in painting for the church of San Felipe el Real at Madrid, destroyed by fire in 1718. He was appointed painter in ordinary to King Philip III of Spain. In 1603, he painted a series of paintings representing the victories of Charles V in the King's dressing-room at the Pardo Palace. He also etched the third, sixth, and seventh plates for Vincenzo Carducci's Dialogues on Painting. He also painted Saint John the Baptist (107 x 86 cm) which is now at the Real Academia de Bellas Artes de San Fernando.

References

Angulo Íñiguez, Diego, y Pérez Sánchez, Alfonso E. Pintura madrileña del primer tercio del siglo XVII, 1969, Madrid: Instituto Diego Velázquez, CSIC

1554 births
1629 deaths
17th-century Spanish painters
Spanish male painters
17th-century engravers
Spanish engravers
Spanish Renaissance painters